Rhythm and Blues at the Flamingo is a live rhythm and blues album recorded by Georgie Fame and the Blue Flames at the Flamingo Club in September 1963 and released by Columbia Records in 1964. It was the first album on which Fame appeared.

In the early 1960s Georgie Fame and the Blue Flames were resident at a number of London clubs including The Flamingo  and the club's manager Rik Gunnell managed the group. On this recording Gunnell's younger brother Johnny can be heard announcing the songs over the noisy club clientele.

The album was produced by Ian Samwell, engineered by Glyn Johns and released on the Columbia label (Columbia 33SX 1599). It failed to chart and the single "Do The Dog", taken from the album and released in the same year, was also commercially unsuccessful.

The vinyl album was re-issued in 1984 on the RSO Records label (RSO SLELP-80), with cover notes by Johnny Gunnell. Gunnell noted: "To Do The Dog involves distinctly sensuous body movements and even the most  suburban members of the audience could not fail to be moved to an almost jungle like frenzy."

Track listing

Personnel

Musicians
Georgie Fame - vocals, Hammond organ
Johnny Marshall - baritone saxophone
Michael Eve - tenor saxophone
Big Jim Sullivan - electric guitar
Rod "Boots" Slade - bass guitar
Red Reece - drums
Tommy Thomas - conga drums

Technical
Produced by Ian Samwell
Engineered by Glyn Johns
Sleeve notes (1984 re-issue) by Johnny Gunnell

References 

1964 live albums
Columbia Records live albums
Georgie Fame albums
Albums produced by Ian Samwell